The 2021 United Nations Security Council election was held on 11 June 2021 during the 75th session of the United Nations General Assembly, held at United Nations Headquarters in New York City. The elections are for five non-permanent seats on the UN Security Council for two-year mandates commencing on 1 January 2022.
In accordance with the Security Council's rotation rules, whereby the ten non-permanent UNSC seats rotate among the various regional blocs into which UN member states traditionally divide themselves for voting and representation purposes, the five available seats are allocated as follows:

Two for Africa 
One for the Asia-Pacific Group. By tradition, this seat is expected to be filled by an Arab state in the Asian group (the prior Arab member, Tunisia, being African).
One for Latin America and the Caribbean
One for the Eastern European Group

The five members will serve on the Security Council for the 2022–23 period.

Candidates

African Group

Asia-Pacific Group

Eastern Europe Group

Latin America and the Caribbean

Result

African and Asia-Pacific Groups

Latin American and Caribbean Group

Eastern European Group

Regarding the election results, 2021 will mark the first time Albania has ever held a Security Council seat. In addition, it will be Brazil's eleventh time, Gabon and Ghana's fourth time, and the UAE's second time sitting on the Security Council.

See also
List of members of the United Nations Security Council
2021 in the United Nations

References

2021 elections
2021
Non-partisan elections